Thailand participated in the 2014 Asian Para Games–Second Asian Para Games in Incheon, South Korea from 18 to 24 October 2014. Athletes from Thailand won total 107 medals (including 21 gold), and finished sixth at the medal table.

Medals summary

Medals by sport

References

Nations at the 2014 Asian Para Games
2014
Asian Para Games